Following is a list of senators of French East Africa, people who have represented the French colonies in East Africa and the Indian Ocean in the Senate of France since the end of World War II (1939–45). Many countries have since declared independence and are thus no longer included in the French Senate.

Comoros

Senators for the Comoros were:

The Comoros declared independent on 6 July 1975, but the island of Mayotte chose to remain with France.
See List of senators of Mayotte for senators for that island.

Madagascar

The Malagasy Republic was proclaimed on 14 October 1958 as an autonomous state within the French Community, and declared full independence two years later.
Senators for French Madagascar before then under the French Fourth Republic were:

Somaliland
 
French Somaliland, officially Côte française des Somalis, became the Territoire des Afar et des Issas on 19 March 1967. From 1977 it has been the Republic of Djibouti.
Senators for French Somaliland under the French Fourth Republic and French Fifth Republic were:

References

Sources

 
Lists of members of the Senate (France) by department